Heinz Büker (born 6 July 1941) was a West German sprint canoeist who competed in the mid-1960s. He won a bronze medal in the K-2 1000 m event at the 1964 Summer Olympics in Tokyo for the United Team of Germany.

Büker also won two medals for West Germany in the K-2 500 m at the ICF Canoe Sprint World Championships with a silver in 1966 and a bronze in 1963.

References

1941 births
Canoeists at the 1964 Summer Olympics
German male canoeists
Living people
Olympic canoeists of the United Team of Germany
Olympic bronze medalists for the United Team of Germany
Olympic medalists in canoeing
ICF Canoe Sprint World Championships medalists in kayak
Medalists at the 1964 Summer Olympics